Tunnack is a rural locality in the local government area of Southern Midlands in the Central region of Tasmania. The 2016 census determined a population of 178 for the state suburb of Tunnack.

History
Tunnack was gazetted as a locality in 1974. The name is an Aboriginal word for “cold”.

Geography
The Coal River forms much of the northern and western boundaries.

Road infrastructure
The C312 route (Tunnack Road / New Country Marsh Road) enters from the north and runs through to the south-east, where it exits. Route C342 (Eldon Road) starts at an intersection with C312 and runs south-west until it exits.

References

Localities of Southern Midlands Council
Towns in Tasmania